Gbéléban is a town in north-western Ivory Coast. It is a sub-prefecture of and seat of Gbéléban Department in Kabadougou Region, Denguélé District. The town is a few hundred metres east of the border with Guinea; there is a border crossing two-and-a-half kilometres north of town.

With a population of just over 2,500, Gbéléban is the least-populated sub-prefecture in Ivory Coast.

Gbéléban was a commune until March 2012, when it became one of 1126 communes nationwide that were abolished.

In 2014, the population of the sub-prefecture of Gbéléban was 2,569.

Villages
The 2 villages of the sub-prefecture of Gbéléban and their population in 2014 are:
 Gbahanla (252)
 Gbéléban (2 317)

References

Sub-prefectures of Kabadougou
Guinea–Ivory Coast border crossings
Former communes of Ivory Coast